Kanai Anzen (家内安全) is a type of omamori, or Japanese amulet of the Shinto religion.  Its purpose is to promote good health and to help those with illnesses. 

Literally, kanai anzen means "Please keep my family from harm," and this can be seen written upon ema as well as omamori suzu (bells).  In the form of an omamori and suzu, this prayer is carried on one's person.

References

Shinto
Amulets
Superstitions of Japan